Pissed is the third studio album by the Texas glam metal band Dangerous Toys. It was released in 1994. In May 2017, it was announced that Pissed would be reissued on September 8, 2017, by EMP Label Group.

Production
Recorded in Northridge, California, the album was produced by Billy Sherwood and Tom Fletcher.

Critical reception

The Columbus Dispatch wrote that Dangerous Toys' "aggressive brand of hard rock is familiar but fresh."

Track listing
All songs by Dangerous Toys.
"Pissed" – 4:10
"Paintrain" – 4:30
"The Law Is Mine" – 3:20
"Promise the Moon" – 3:43
"Strange" – 4:17
"Loser" – 3:59
"Hard Luck Champion" – 3:36
"Screamin' for More" – 3:02
"Oh Well, So What!" – 3:20
"Illustrated Man" – 4:28

Personnel
Dangerous Toys
 Jason McMaster - Vocals
 Scott Dalhover - Guitars
 Paul Lidel - Guitars, Backing Vocals
 Mike Watson - Bass, Backing Vocals
 Mark Geary - Drums

Production
Billy Sherwood - Producer, Mixing
Tom Fletcher - Producer, Engineer, Mixing
Wally Trauogh - Mastering
Richard Easterling - Remastering (2017 Reissue)
Thom Hazaert - A&R, Executive Producer (2017 Reissue)
David Ellefson - Executive Producer (2017 Reissue)

References

Dangerous Toys albums
1994 albums
Albums produced by Billy Sherwood